Albaret-le-Comtal is a commune in the Lozère department in southern France.

Population

Economy
The village lies at the foot of a hydroelectric plant. The plant was built between 1916 and 1919 to supply energy to the hydrometallurgic factory at nearby Saint-Chély-du-Tarn.

See also
Communes of the Lozère department

References

Communes of Lozère